Hyperolius lucani is a species of frog in the family Hyperoliidae.
It is endemic to Angola.
Its natural habitats are rivers, freshwater marshes, and intermittent freshwater marshes.

References

lucani
Endemic fauna of Angola
Amphibians described in 1885
Taxonomy articles created by Polbot